Clutch of the Tiger is a collaboration album by musicians Clutchy Hopkins and Shawn Lee. It was released in 2008 on vinyl and CD, both under the Ubiquity Records label.

Track listing 

 "Full Moon" – 3:36
 "Two Steps Back" – 3:58
 "Things Change" – 3:26
 "Bill Blows It" – 5:29
 "So Easily, So Naturally" – 3:40
 "Leon Me" – 3:35
 "Dollar Short" – 4:21
 "When I Was Young" – 3:52
 "Across the Pond" – 3:47
 "Bad Influence" – 3:05
 "Till Next Time" – 4:32
 "Indian Burn" – 4:41

References

External links 
 Discogs.com
 [ Allmusic.com]
 Ubiquityrecords.com

2008 albums
Earache Records albums